The Besleney Kabardian dialect (Besłæneibzæ [bejsɬanejəbza]) is one of the East Circassian dialects and usually considered a dialect of Kabardian. However, because the Besleney tribe lived at the center of Circassia, the Besleney dialect also shares a large number of features with dialects of Western Circassian.

Phonology

Palatalized velar stops

Like some other Kabardian dialects, the Besleney dialect has a palatalized voiced velar stop  , a palatalized voiceless velar stop   and a palatalized velar ejective   that were merged with дж , ч  and кӏ  in most Circassian dialects. 
 
 Besleney гь  became дж  in other dialects:

 Besleney кь  became ч  in other dialects:

 Besleney кӏь  became кӏ  in other dialects:

Palato-alveolar affricates

The palato-alveolar affricate consonants дж , ч  and кӏ  and the retroflex affricate consonants чъ  and чӏ  became palato-alveolar дж , дж , кӏ , дж  and кӏ   in Besleney while in Kabardian they became alveolo-palatal ж , ж , щӏ , ж  and щӏ .

 Western ч  became дж  in Besleney and ж  in Kabardian :

 Western кӏ  survived in Besleney and became щӏ  in Kabardian :

 Western чъ  became дж  in Besleney and ж  in Kabardian :

Others 

 Besleney чъ  ↔ ш  in other dialects:

See also
 Hakuchi Adyghe dialect
 Shapsug Adyghe dialect
 Bzhedug Adyghe Dialect
 Abzakh Adyghe dialect

References

External links
 UCLA Phonetics Lab Archive - Recording Details for Kabardian Beslenei dialect

Kabardian language